The 2020 California Proposition 18 would allow 17-year-olds to vote in primary and special elections if they will turn 18 by the subsequent general election.

Appearing on the ballot in the 2020 California elections on November 3, 2020, the proposed state constitutional amendment was originally introduced as California Assembly Constitutional Amendment No. 4 (ACA 4) by Assemblymember Kevin Mullin. ACA 4 passed the California State Assembly on August 22, 2019, amended and passed by the California State Senate on June 25, 2020, and was re-approved by the California State Assembly on June 26, 2020.  After being put on the ballot, ACA 4 was given the ballot designation of Prop 18. Because it is a proposed constitutional amendment, 2020 Proposition 18 must appear as a ballot proposition and be approved by voters.

Proposition 18 is one of two proposed ballot measures in the 2020 California elections that would expand voting rights. The other is Proposition 17, which would allow individuals on parole to vote. Even though Proposition 17 passed, Proposition 18 failed, by a margin of roughly twelve percentage points.

Background 
In the last 20 years, California has held primary elections in February (2008), March (2000, 2002, 2004, 2020), and June (2006, 2008, 2010, 2012, 2014, 2016).  Currently, 18 other states and the District of Columbia allow people who are 17 to vote in a primary if they will be 18 by the general election in November. Both of these are proposed amendments to the California Constitution that originated in the California State Assembly.

Campaign

Support 
The official Argument in Favor of ACA 4 was submitted by Assemblymember Kevin Mullin and Assemblymember Evan Low.

Endorsements

Newspapers
The Bakersfield Californian
East Los Angeles College Campus Times
Los Angeles Times
Mountain View Voice
Palo Alto Weekly
San Diego Jewish World
The San Diego Union-Tribune
San Francisco Chronicle
Santa Barbara Independent
Organisations
California Democratic Party

California Green Party
East Bay for Everyone
Equality California
League of Women Voters California
ACLUs of Northern and Southern California
Peace and Freedom Party
San Francisco League of Pissed Off Voters
National Nurses United
California Federation of Teachers
SEIU United Healthcare Workers West
Individuals
Gavin Newsom, Governor of California
Alex Padilla, California Secretary of State

Opposition 
The official Argument Against ACA 4 was submitted by Ruth Weiss, Co-Founder of the Election Integrity Project California, Jon Coupal, President of the Howard Jarvis Taxpayers Association, and Larry Sand, a retired teacher.

Endorsements

Newspapers
The Mercury News
The Orange County Register
The Press-Telegram
Santa Cruz Sentinel
The Desert Sun
Palo Alto Daily Post
Santa Barbara News-Press

Organisations
California Republican Party
Election Integrity Project California
Howard Jarvis Taxpayers Association

Polling

Results

Notes

References 

2020 California ballot propositions
Failed amendments to the Constitution of California